Palestine competed at the 2013 World Championships in Athletics in Moscow, Russia, from 10–18 August 2013. A team of one athlete was announced to represent the country in the event.

Results

(q – qualified, NM – no mark, SB – season best)

Men

References

External links
IAAF World Championships – Palestine

Nations at the 2013 World Championships in Athletics
World Championships in Athletics
Sport in the State of Palestine
Palestine at the World Championships in Athletics
Athletics in the State of Palestine